Huang Yong-chun (黃榮椿, Pinyin: Huáng Róng-chūn; born 1 September 1935) is a Taiwanese judoka. He competed in the men's heavyweight event at the 1964 Summer Olympics.

References

1935 births
Living people
Taiwanese male judoka
Olympic judoka of Taiwan
Judoka at the 1964 Summer Olympics
Place of birth missing (living people)
20th-century Taiwanese people